The Hans-Bredow-Institut for Media Research at the University of Hamburg (HBI) is an independent non-profit foundation with the mission on media research on public communication, particularly for radio and television broadcasting (including public service media providers) and other electronic media, in an interdisciplinary fashion.

Established on May 30, 1950, the Institute was founded by then Nordwestdeutscher Rundfunk (NWDR) and the University of Hamburg as a legal foundation. Named after the "Father of German Broadcasting" Hans Bredow (1879-1959)
, the Institute has its founding on his idea of broadcasting councils, an unprecedented notion for media governance at the time. It rejects both the German bureaucratic state of Weimar period and the Nazi seizure of power, and favours organizational structures that included political representations and civic organizations. In 1954 for his contribution in building the organizational structures of the broadcasting in the Federal Republic, the Federal Cross of Merit was awarded.  Hans Bredow's place in German broadcasting history was compared to John Reith's in British broadcasting history.

The Institute is known by media researchers for its publication of International Media Handbook [Internationales Handbuch Medien]

Together with various German institutions in Berlin, the Hans-Bredow-Institut joins the foundation of a research centre on Internet and Society in 2011 called the Alexander von Humboldt Institute for Internet and Society.
 Its director Wolfgang Schulz is also one of the directors of the Alexander von Humboldt Institute for Internet and Society in Berlin.

References

External links

 The Hans-Bredow-Institut Homepage

Research institutes in Germany
University of Hamburg
1950 establishments in West Germany
Mass media in Hamburg
Norddeutscher Rundfunk
Research institutes established in 1950